Katharine M. "Kathy" Watson is a former representative of the 144th Legislative District of Pennsylvania, United States. She served on the House Aging and Older Adult Services, Ethics, Health and Human Services, Liquor Control and Transportation Committees and was chairman of the House Subcommittee on Care and Services and the House Subcommittee on Transportation Safety. She was also a member of the House Republican Policy Committee.

Career
Watson has extensive experience working in local government. She served as Director of Public Information and subsequently as Deputy Administrator for Bucks County. She was also a Township Supervisor and a member of the Central Bucks School Board. Watson also served as the founder and first director of the Bucks County Highway Safety Program.

Watson was previously a high school English teacher for Springfield High School in Delaware County and also operated a home-based public relations firm, Coleraine Consultants, P.R.

Personal
Watson and her husband reside in Warrington Township, Bucks County and have one adult son, who is a photographer and designer.

References

External links
Representative Kathy Watson's official web site
Pennsylvania House Republican Caucus site

Republican Party members of the Pennsylvania House of Representatives
Women state legislators in Pennsylvania
Living people
21st-century American politicians
21st-century American women politicians
Year of birth missing (living people)